Corroios is a civil parish in the municipality of Seixal in the district of Setúbal, Portugal. It is part of the Lisbon metropolitan area. The population in 2011 was 47,661, in an area of 17.11 km². Corroios remains as the second most populous town in Portugal, after Algueirão-Mem Martins (note: this ranking includes only vilas [towns] and excludes cidades [cities]). The town is located on the south side of the Tagus River, opposite Lisbon, the capital of Portugal.

Corroios has many immigrants, mainly from Africa but also from Eastern Europe and Asia and one third of the population is below the age of 25 years.

History
The oldest traces of human presence in the Corroios territory date from the Roman occupation and can be found in Quinta do Rouxinol.

In 1385 Almada, including a part of Corroios, was donated to D. Nuno Alvares Pereira, Constable of the Kingdom, by King João I. D. Nuno used his land in Corroios to create a farm and in 1403, he built the first mill of the municipality of Seixal: the still-standing Corroios Tidal Mill, now preserved and kept as an industrial monument, but still functional.

The Corroios parish was founded in 1369, until then it was a part of the larger Almada that encompassed most of the current territories of Almada and Seixal.

During the Age of Discovery, this was an important loading area of shipments to Lisbon.

With the creation of the Municipality of Seixal on November 6, 1836, Corroios was extinct and merged into the Freguesia of Amora. But on April 7, 1979, after almost 150 years, the Freguesia of Corroios was restored to an independent village.

On May 20, 1993, Corroios rose into a town.

Furthermore, Corroios has an important natural heritage; one such example being the Corroios Salt Marsh (Sapal de Corroios), which is integrated in the REN-National Ecological Reserve.

Localities
The parish has the following neighborhoods:

Vale de Milhaços
Alto do Moinho
Santa Marta do Pinhal
Miratejo
Pinhal de Vidal
Verdizela.

Architecture

Civic
 Barrio CDH-M.N. Tiago
 Estate of Castelo
 Tidal Mill of Corroios
 Estate of Rouxinol

Military
 Gunpowder Factory of Vale de Milhaços

Religious
 Church of Nossa Senhora da Graça

Education
Corroios has six primary schools, two secondary schools and one high school:
Escola Secundária João de Barros
Escola Básica 2º e 3º Ciclos de Corroios 
Escola Básica 2º e 3º Ciclos de Vale de Milhaços 
Escola Básica 1º Ciclo Nº1 de Corroios 
Escola Básica 1º Ciclo Quinta do Campo 
Escola Básica 1º Ciclo Alto do Moinho 
Escola Básica 1º Ciclo Dom Nuno Álvares Pereira 
Escola Básica 1º Ciclo Quinta da Cabouca 
Escola Básica 1º Ciclo Miratejo

References

External links
Official website 

Freguesias of Seixal